Barzilay is a surname. Notable people with the surname include:

 Judith Barzilay (born 1944), American judge
 Dvorah Barzilay-Yegar (born 1933), Israeli historian
 Regina Barzilay (born 1971), professor at the Massachusetts Institute of Technology